Telehit News is an entertainment news show from the Mexican TV network Telehit hosted by Odalys Ramírez and Karla.

References
Telehit News official website

Mexican television news shows